City View is a 300 ft (91m) residential highrise in Pittsburgh, Pennsylvania. It was completed in 1964 and has 26 floors. It is tied with the Commonwealth Building and The Carlyle for the 26th tallest building in Pittsburgh.  It was designed by I.M. Pei. From its inception in 1964 until 2014 it was known as Washington Plaza.

See also
List of tallest buildings in Pittsburgh

References

External links
 
Emporis
Skyscraperpage

Buildings and structures completed in 1964
I. M. Pei buildings
Residential skyscrapers in Pittsburgh